James Allen St. John (October 1, 1872 – May 23, 1957) was an American author, artist and illustrator.  He is especially remembered for his illustrations for the novels of Edgar Rice Burroughs, although he illustrated works of many types.  He taught at the Chicago Art Institute and with the American Academy of Art. He is considered by many to be 'The Godfather of Modern Fantasy Art'. His most famous disciples were Roy Krenkel and Frank Frazetta, the latter of whom has also been styled as the grandmaster of the Genre.

St. John's artistic career began in 1898. He studied at the Art Students League of New York which included William Merritt Chase, F.V. Du Mond, George de Forest Brush, H. Siddons Mowbray, Carol Beckwith and Kenyan Cox. This was followed by his first commercial relationship with the New York Herald.  During this period he spent time in Paris from 1906 to 1908 at the Académie Julian, then moved to Chicago around 1912 and would eventually live at Tree Studios art colony until his death. While in Chicago he became close friends with artist Louis Grell.  Here he began his work with the publisher A.C. McClurg & Co., although he had already produced his best-known work for this publisher back in 1905, The Face in the Pool, which he had both written and illustrated.

References

External links

 http://www.isfdb.org/cgi-bin/pl.cgi?261822  Publication: The Paintings of J. Allen St. John: Grand Master of Fantasy Publication Record # 261822 Authors: Stephen D. Korshak, J. David Spurlock, J. Allen St. John Date: 2008-07-00  Publisher: Vanguard Productions Type: NONFICTION Cover: The Paintings of J. Allen St. John: Grand Master of Fantasy (1925) • by J. Allen St. John (variant of The Eternal Lover)

Biography at ERBzine.com
 
 
 
 The Paintings of J. Allen St. John: Grand Master of Fantasy (book) at VanguardProductions.net
 Illustrators: J. Allen St. John (bpib.com/illustrat)
 
  (alphabetization failure?)

1872 births
1957 deaths
School of the Art Institute of Chicago alumni
American illustrators
Fantasy artists
Artists from Chicago
Science fiction artists
American speculative fiction artists
Pulp fiction artists